The Birch Islands are two islands in Pleasant Bay, Washington County, Maine, United States. The islands, Upper and Lower Birch, are connected at low tide.

The islands are privately owned, with only one residence. They are part of the Town of Addison.

See also
 List of islands of Maine

References

External links
 Boat Maine USA

Islands of Washington County, Maine
Islands of Maine
Coastal islands of Maine
Private islands of Maine